ICEkunion() is a company that was created by Sigongsa, Seoul Munhwasa(two of the four largest media empires in Korea) and Haksan Publishing that published South Korean manhwa comics in the United States. The firm's industry experience come from Studio ICE. Titles were licensed from manhwa publishing companies that originally sold them in The Republic of Korea in the Korean language.  According to an interview conducted by ICV2, the original creators themselves were involved in the adaptation process for the English-language markets.
In July 2007 it was announced through PW Comic Week that Ice Kunion was going to be completely absorbed by Yen Press, Hatchette's new manga impress. Manga released through ICEkunion is expected to be picked up through the new company, but will not release until spring 2008. Manhwa bearing the ICEkunion logo will remain in stores, but following prints will bear the Yen Press logo.

ICEkunion's former editorial director Ju-Youn Lee (now Yen Press' senior editor) is quoted with saying "I asked them, would they like to join Yen Press with all the resources of Hachette behind the titles. They decided it would be a better chance to take risks with Hachette." Lee said that while the ICE Kunion co-venture was a good project, "We didn’t have any staff working in U.S., and we had our limits doing work from Korea."

Both of ICEkunion's listed websites no longer have any information listed, with www.icekunion.com now directing to a website that advertises free manhwa. Yen Press has said that the website will eventually redirect to the new Yen Press website.

List of published titles
 The 11th Cat
 Angel Diary
 The Antique Gift Shop
 Bring It On! by Baek hye kyung
 Chocolat by Shin Ji Sang
 Comic (manhwa) by Ha Si-hyun
 Cynical Orange
 Forest of Gray City(잿빛 도시 숲을 달리다)
 Heavenly Executioner Chiwoo
 Hissing
 Moon Boy
 One Thousand and One Nights
 Real Lies by Lee Shi-Young

References

External links
 Link to article detailing absorption of company

Manhwa distributors